Tianchang is a sub-prefecture-level city in the east of Anhui province, and is the closest city in the province to the mouth of the Yangtze River. It is bordered by the Jiangsu county-level divisions of Luhe District (Nanjing) to the southwest, Yizheng City to the southeast, Gaoyou City to the east, Jinhu County to the northeast, and Xuyi County to the northwest, as well as Anhui's Lai'an County to the west.

Administrative divisions
Tianchang City has 1 subdistrict and 14 towns.
1 Subdistrict
 Tianchang Subdistrict

14 Towns

Climate

References

Chuzhou
Cities in Anhui